"American Gothic" is also the name of a storyline in comics related to the Swamp Thing.

American Gothic is a horror/western story from 2000 AD, created by Ian Edginton and Mike Collins.

Plot
A group of freaks and monsters are trying to escape to a better life in the American West but are being hunted. A lone vampire cowboy eventually agrees to help them.

Publication
American Gothic (by Ian Edginton and Mike Collins, in 2000 AD #1432–1440, 2005).

See also

Fiends of the Eastern Front, another major 2000 AD story containing vampires.

External links
 2000 AD profile

2000 AD comic strips
Comics by Ian Edginton
Vampires in comics
Western (genre) comics